Khin San Hlaing is a Burmese politician and political prisoner who currently serves as a Pyithu Hluttaw member of parliament for Pale Township. In the 1990 Burmese general election, she was elected as an Pyithu Hluttaw MP, winning a majority of 29,805 (75% of the votes), but was never allowed to assume her seat.

Khin San Hlaing attended Wetlet State High School and obtained a Bachelor of Laws (LLB) degree in 1982. She began working as a High Court advocate in 1985.

References

Members of Pyithu Hluttaw
National League for Democracy politicians
Prisoners and detainees of Myanmar
1956 births
Living people
People from Sagaing Region
Burmese women lawyers
20th-century Burmese lawyers